M. M. Basheer is a Malayalam literary critic who has written more than forty critical works on Malayalam poetry, short stories and novels.

Life

M M Basheer was set to write a series of newspaper columns on the Ramayana in the Malayalam daily Mathrubhumi from August. Basheer’s series on Ramayana has been a regular feature  during the Malayalam month of Karkidakam which is observed as ‘Ramayana month’. His work Thiricharivukal received the Abu Dhabi Sakthi Award for Literary Criticism (Thayat Award) in 2014.

References

Year of birth missing (living people)
Living people
Writers from Kozhikode
Malayalam literary critics
Academic staff of the University of Calicut
Indian male short story writers
Malayalam-language writers
21st-century Indian short story writers
21st-century Indian male writers
Recipients of the Abu Dhabi Sakthi Award